The Cuban Assets Control Regulations, are regulations of the United States Department of the Treasury on July 8, 1963, under the Trading with the Enemy Act of 1917, that general regulate relations between Cuba and the U.S. and are the main mechanism of domestic enforcement of the United States embargo against Cuba.

It was recently modified by the Office of Foreign Assets Control.

Authority 

The relevant laws are:

 
 
 
 
 U.S.C. App 1–44
 , 
 , 
 , 
 , 
 Proc. 3447, 3 CFR, 1959–1963 Comp., p. 157

References 

Boycotts of Cuba
United States trade law
Cuba–United States relations